Woburn Manor is a historic home and farm located near Sharpsburg, Washington County, Maryland, United States. The manor house is a Federal style, -story stuccoed stone dwelling with a gable roof structure built around 1820. The stucco is incised to resemble cut block. The property includes a landscaped yard with terracing to the south, stone outbuildings including an out kitchen and smokehouse, and slave quarters.

Woburn Manor was listed on the National Register of Historic Places in 2000.

References

External links
, including photo in 1974, at Maryland Historical Trust

Houses on the National Register of Historic Places in Maryland
Houses in Washington County, Maryland
Houses completed in 1819
Federal architecture in Maryland
National Register of Historic Places in Washington County, Maryland
Slave cabins and quarters in the United States